The gens Stlaccia was a minor plebeian family at ancient Rome.  Hardly any members of this gens are mentioned in history, but a number are known from inscriptions.  By the second century, some of the Sltaccii had reached senatorial rank.

Origin
The nomen Stlaccius is of Oscan origin.

Members

 Gaius Stlaccius, a maker of amphorae whose workshop was along the Baetis in Hispania.  Some of his pottery was found at the Baths of Diocletian, in Rome.
 Decimus Stlaccius, named in an inscription from Delos, dating from the second century BC.
 Marcus Stlaccius M. l, a freedman employed as a scriba at Rome about the middle of the first century BC.
 Marcus Stlaccius M. f., sailed on one of Caesar's ships during the African War in 46 BC, and was captured, but subsequently freed.
 Quintus Stlaccius, named in an inscription from Delos, dating from the second century BC.
 Tertia Stlaccia, named in an inscription from Delos, dating from the second century BC.
 Gaius Stlaccius C. l. A[...], a freedman at Neapolis in Campania, where he worked as a mensor sacomarius, or measurer of weights, together with Aulus Stlaccius Mario.
 Marcus Stlaccius Albinus Trebellius Sallustius Rufus, one of the senatorial patrons of an order for the enlargement of a temple at Ostia in Latium in AD 142.
 Lucius Stlaccius L. f. Macedo, a resident of Cyrene, mentioned in a decree of Augustus, dating to 6 or 7 BC, along with his brother, Aulus Stlaccius Maximus.
 Aulus Stlaccius A. l. Mario, a freedman at Neapolis, where he worked as a mensor sacomarius, together with Gaius Stlaccius.
 Aulus Stlaccius L. f. Maximus, a resident of Cyrene, mentioned in a decree of Augustus, along with his brother, Lucius Stlaccius Macedo.
 Stlaccia Ɔ. l. Quinta, a wealthy freedwoman who dedicated a tomb at Rome for herself, her husband, and her dispensator, or steward, Salvius.

See also
 List of Roman gentes

References

Bibliography
 Theodor Mommsen et alii, Corpus Inscriptionum Latinarum (The Body of Latin Inscriptions, abbreviated CIL), Berlin-Brandenburgische Akademie der Wissenschaften (1853–present).
 Wilhelm Henzen, Ephemeris Epigraphica: Corporis Inscriptionum Latinarum Supplementum (Journal of Inscriptions: Supplement to the Corpus Inscriptionum Latinarum, abbreviated EE), Institute of Roman Archaeology, Rome (1872–1913).
 August Pauly, Georg Wissowa, et alii, Realencyclopädie der Classischen Altertumswissenschaft (Scientific Encyclopedia of the Knowledge of Classical Antiquities, abbreviated RE or PW), J. B. Metzler, Stuttgart (1894–1980).
 Paul von Rohden, Elimar Klebs, & Hermann Dessau, Prosopographia Imperii Romani (The Prosopography of the Roman Empire, abbreviated PIR), Berlin (1898).

Roman gentes